Lekoni-Lekori is a department of Haut-Ogooué Province in southeastern Gabon. Its capital is Akieni. It had a population of 10,028 in 2013.

Towns and villages

References

Departments of Gabon
Haut-Ogooué Province